The 2019–20 season is Al-Ittihad's 44th consecutive season in the top flight of Saudi football and 93rd year in existence as a football club. The club will participate in the Pro League, the King Cup, the 2019 AFC Champions League and the Arab Club Champions Cup.

The season covers the period from 1 July 2019 to 30 June 2020.

Players

Squad information

Out on loan

Transfers and loans

Transfers in

Loans in

Transfers out

Loans out

Pre-season

Competitions

Overall

Overview

Goalscorers

Last Updated: 9 September 2020

Clean sheets

Last Updated: 9 September 2020

Notes

References

Ittihad FC seasons
Ittihad